The Alexander Lebed Military Institute of the Ministry of Defense, is a higher military institution based in Tiraspol that is operated by the military department of the Armed Forces of Transnistria. It is the seniormost educational institution in the armed forces. It is headed by Colonel Igor Dovgulich.

Background
It was founded originally on 7 May 1993 and was reorganized as an independent institution from the military faculty of the civilian Shevchenko Transnistria State University on 30 April 2008. In August 2009, the institute was awarded a battle flag and was given the honor of being renamed to honor Alexander Lebed in July 2012. By decree of President Yevgeny Shevchuk on 19 August 2015, it was reorganized into a higher state educational institution.

Officer training
The training of cadets is carried out in a four-year training program in accordance with the established state educational standards of vocational training. The training is conducted in three areas: the commander of a motorized rifle platoon, the commander of an artillery platoon and an officer-educator.

The form of education is full-time, with training being carried out in the Russian language primarily. In addition, the institute provides training for reserve officers from among male students studying in the full-time department of Shevchenko University who are under the age of 27 years. Upon graduation, cadets are assigned an officer rank of Lieutenant. The military institute operates a research laboratory called SEARCH, founded in 2002. The SEARCH research laboratory is aimed at collecting, analyzing the experience of local wars and recent military conflicts, developing and summarizing educational and methodological reference materials, as well as publishing electronic textbooks.

Activities
Cadets have the role of taking part in the historical column of Victory Day Parades and the Republic Day of Transnistria parade. Dressed in the uniforms of the Red Army, they usually carry the standards of all 13 fronts of the Great Patriotic War. They also drive the T-34-85, the Katyusha rocket launcher, and the American Willy car.

Leaders of the Military Institute
 Head of the Military Institute
 First Deputy Head of the Institute - Head of the Educational Unit
 Deputy Head of the Institute for Educational Work
 Deputy Chief of the Institute - Commander of a Cadet Battalion
 Deputy Head of the Institute for Logistics
 Deputy Head of the Institute for Armaments - Head of the Technical Department

Departments of the Military Institute
 Department of Tactics
 Department of Military Use of Weapons
 Department of Armament and Shooting
 Department of Operation of Armored and Automotive Vehicles
 Department of Moral and Psychological Support
 Department of Peacekeeping Management
 Department of Physical Education and Sport
 Department of Special Military Disciplines

See also
 Alexandru cel Bun Military Academy
 Ivan Chernyakhovsky National Defense University of Ukraine
 Military University of the Ministry of Defense of the Russian Federation

References

External links
 Official Website

Military of Transnistria
Military academies
Educational institutions established in 1993
1993 in Transnistria